The Citroën DS3 WRC is the World Rally Car built for the Citroën World Rally Team by Citroën Racing for use from the 2011 World Rally Championship season. It is based upon the Citroën DS3 road car, and replaced the highly successful Citroën C4 WRC. It was built to the new World Rally Car regulations for 2011, which were based upon the existing Super 2000 regulations, but is powered by a turbocharged 1.6-litre engine rather than the normally aspirated 2-litre engine found in Super 2000 cars.

Development work on the car was carried out during 2010 by Citroën drivers Sébastien Loeb, Dani Sordo, Sébastien Ogier and test driver Philippe Bugalski, as well as sister Peugeot drivers Kris Meeke and Stéphane Sarrazin.

The engine has been specifically developed for this car (older regulations required that the engine be based on an existing mass-produced engine's cylinder block and head gasket).

In October 2012, Citroën announced the DS3 RRC intended for use in the championships below that of the WRC: WRC-2 (formerly S-WRC), European Rally Championship (ERC), Middle East Rally Championship (MERC), some national championships and so on. Visually and internally, the two models (DS3 WRC and RRC) are different since the regulations are more restrictive on the RRC. The other significant change concerns the brakes in tarmac configuration: the diameter of the discs has been reduced from 355 to 350 mm and the water-cooling system has been removed.

At the 2016 Rally Finland, Kris Meeke established a new record for the fastest FIA WRC round in history, with a 126.60 km/h average speed.

World Rally Championship results

WRC championship titles

WRC victories

Complete WRC results

See also
 Citroën C3 WRC
 Ford Fiesta RS WRC
 Ford Fiesta WRC
 Hyundai i20 WRC
 Hyundai i20 Coupe WRC
 Mini John Cooper Works WRC
 Toyota Yaris WRC
 Volkswagen Polo R WRC

References

DS3 WRC juwra.com

External links
 Citroën World Rally Team

World Rally Cars
DS3 WRC
All-wheel-drive vehicles
World Rally championship-winning cars